Hotel Chocolat is a British chocolate manufacturer and cocoa grower. The company produces and distributes chocolate and other cocoa related products online and through a network of cafés, restaurants, outlets, and factory stores. Hotel Chocolat is the only company in the United Kingdom to grow cocoa on its own farm.

History

In 1988, Angus Thirlwell and Peter Harris began designing and selling mints under the brand "MMC", before moving to chocolates about six years later. Rebranded as "Geneva Chocolates", the current co-founders of Hotel Chocolat adapted trade to the catalogue-based world and before long, had steered towards the name "Chocolate Express".

In 1998, the Chocolate Tasting Club was launched in Britain; as of 2014, it has around 100,000 members. To date, the Tasting Club has trialled over 1,500 different recipes. As detailed on their website, the Chocolate Tasting Club sends out boxes to customers all over the country each month.

In 2003, Chocolate Express (ChocExpress) rebranded as Hotel Chocolat and launched its first retail store in the center of Watford. The company then grew initially to having four stores in the East Anglian area, with stores in Milton Keynes, Cambridge and St Albans opening between 2005 and 2006. Today, the company has over 70 around the UK.

In 2006, the company officially acquired the Rabot Estate in Saint Lucia, and is, to date, the only company in the UK to own its own cocoa farm. This farm is one of the reasons given for the company choosing not to be Fair Trade-accredited, as only smallholdings are allowed.

In 2011, Hotel Chocolat opened its Boucan Hotel in Saint Lucia. The hotel sits on the Rabot Estate which is perched high up between the Piton mountains. The hotel currently has six lodges and a cocoa-inspired Boucan Restaurant.

In November 2013, Hotel Chocolat opened two UK restaurants, Rabot 1745 in London's Borough Market, and Roast + Conch in Leeds.

In May 2016, Hotel Chocolat became listed on the London Stock Exchange as Hotel Chocolat Group PLC.

In August 2017, Hotel Chocolat opened its first stores in the Republic of Ireland in Dundrum, Dublin.

In January 2019, British television station Channel 5 aired a two part documentary titled "Inside Hotel Chocolat". Another British television station, Channel 4, aired a documentary titled "Hotel Chocolat: Inside the Chocolate Factory" in August of 2022.

Corporate affairs

Leadership 
Hotel Chocolate is led by cofounders Angus Thirlwell (CEO) and Peter Harris.

Locations 
Hotel Chocolate has more than 100 shops in the United Kingdom and 33 stores in Japan (as of May 2022). In 2022, the company announced to close all five locations in North America. It continues operation online and through a network of wholesalers.

Shareholder structure 
As of 30th September 2022 major shareholders in the company include Angus Thirlwell (27.1%), Peter Harris (27.1%), Phoenix Asset Management Partners (11.1%) and Columbia Threadneedle Investments (4.9%).

Products 
The company produces a variety of chocolate-based confectionary, including regular chocolate bars, blocks, loose chocolates and a variety of seasonal and gift products. It also offers beverages like hot chocolates and alcohol. In 2022 the company launched a chocolate subscription service.

The Velvetiser 
Released in 2018, The Velvetiser was launched as the first, at-home hot chocolate machine, designed to heat & mix (Velvetise) milk, dairy or plant-based, and chocolate shavings to offer a coffee shop style drink at home.

Rabot Estate, St. Lucia 
Hotel Chocolate owns and operates a  estate in the south west of St Lucia, near Soufrière. Rabot Estate is home to a luxury hotel and a cocoa plantation that is divided into 16 different areas. The cocoa trees of Rabot Estate are primarily Trinitario species.

The Rabot Estate is part of Hotel Chocolat’s 'Engaged Ethics' Cocoa Programme (HCCAPEE). Over a hundred new jobs have been created since the estate’s opening, and with prices guaranteed to be 30–40% above the world market price of cocoa, as well as being paid within a week of selling their crops, local farmers are provided with a secure income.

See also
 List of bean-to-bar chocolate manufacturers

References

External links
 

1988 establishments in the United Kingdom
British chocolate companies
Food and drink companies established in 1988
English brands